Oles may refer to:

 
 
 Oles (Villaviciosa), a parish in Villaviciosa, Spain
 The nickname for athletic teams at St. Olaf College, Northfield, Minnesota, U.S.

See also
 OLE (disambiguation)
 Olesya (disambiguation)